Li Yannian (11 March 1904 – 17 November 1974) was a Kuomintang lieutenant-general from Shandong.

Early life and career
General Li was a member of the first graduate class of the Whampoa Military Academy. His classmate was General Du Yuming. During the Northern Expedition, he was promoted from platoon leader to regimental colonel in the first corps of the National Revolutionary Army. When the NRA reorganized itself in 1928, he was named as deputy commander of the second Division, and in 1931 he was placed in charge of the garrison brigade of the NRA general headquarters and participated in the anti-communist Encirclement Campaigns.

Second Sino-Japanese War
When the Second Sino-Japanese War broke out, General Li was promoted to commander of the second corps, he was one of the youngest corps commander of the entire NRA. He led his troops in the Battle of Shanghai and the Battle of Wuhan. He was then promoted to commander of the 11th army and commander-in-chief of 34th army group.

Chinese Civil War
In June 1945, he was named deputy commander-in-chief of the 11th war zone and was in charge of the surrender of Imperial Japanese Army units in Shandong Province. In the Huaihai Campaign, he was named the commander of the 6th army, and he and General Liu Ruming's 8th army tried but failed relieved the 12th army led by General Huang Wei in the Shuangduiji Campaign. In the late phase of the Civil War, General Li was in charge of the defense of Foochow, Fujian Province when he believed a rumor spread by a local nationalist commander and abandoned his post without a fight. He was promptly arrested and because the false testimony provided by his chief of staff, he was sentenced to 10 years in prison. He received a parole a year later and died on 17 November 1974.

References

1904 births
1974 deaths
National Revolutionary Army generals from Shandong
People from Dongying
Taiwanese people from Shandong